Queenmaker is an upcoming South Korean streaming television series directed by Oh Jin-seok and starring Kim Hee-ae, Moon So-ri, and Ryu Soo-young. It is scheduled to be released on Netflix on April 14, 2023.

Synopsis 
Hwang Do-hee (Kim Hee-ae), was a genius of image-making who controlled the strategic planning office of a conglomerate. Oh Seung-sook (Moon So-ri) a human rights lawyer who has lived like a weed, called a rhinoceros and jumps into the election board to make her the mayor of Seoul.

Cast

Main 
 Kim Hee-ae as Hwang Do-hee: a former member of the future strategy planning office of Eunsung Group.
 Moon So-ri as Oh Seung-sook: a human rights lawyer wwho is called the “rhino of justice”, holding hands for the Seoul mayoral election.
 Ryu Soo-young as Baek Jae-min: another Seoul mayoral candidate.

Supporting 
 Seo Yi-sook as Son Young-sim: the chairman of Eunsung Group
 Kim Tae-hoon as Ma Joong-seok
 Ok Ja-yeon
 Jin Kyung
 Lee Geung-young
 Kim Byeong-ok
 Yoon Ji-hye
 Kim Sae-byuk

References

External links 
 
 

Television series by AStory
2023 web series debuts
South Korean web series
Korean-language Netflix original programming
South Korean political television series
2023 South Korean television series debuts
Upcoming Netflix original programming